The 2000–01 season was the 55th season in Rijeka's history. It was their 10th season in the Prva HNL and 27th successive top tier season.

Competitions

Prva HNL

First stage

Second stage (relegation play-off)

Results summary

Results by round

Matches

Prva HNL

Source: HRnogomet.com

Croatian Cup

Source: HRnogomet.com

UEFA Cup

Source: HRnogomet.com

Squad statistics
Competitive matches only.  Appearances in brackets indicate numbers of times the player came on as a substitute.

See also
2000–01 Prva HNL
2000–01 Croatian Cup
2000–01 UEFA Cup

References

External links
 2000–01 Prva HNL at HRnogomet.com
 2000–01 Croatian Cup at HRnogomet.com 
 Prvenstvo 2000.-2001. at nk-rijeka.hr

HNK Rijeka seasons
Rijeka